Hoşköy can refer to:

 Hoşköy, Elâzığ
 Hoşköy, Şenkaya